Oncopoda is a hypothetical group of animals comprising the Onychophora, Tardigrada and Pentastomida.

References 

Ecdysozoa taxa